Chamanthedon tapeina is a moth of the family Sesiidae. It is known from South Africa.

The head, thorax and abdomen are black with a slight blue-green gloss. There are slight dorsal patches of golden-cupreous scales on second and fourth segments of the abdomen. The forewings are brown, but the cell and a fascia below it are hyaline (glass like). There is a dark-brown discoidal spot and hyaline streaks in the interspaces beyond the cell between veins nine and three running towards the termen. The hindwings are hyaline, although the veins and margins are narrowly brown and the cilia white.

References

Endemic moths of South Africa
Sesiidae
Moths of Africa
Moths described in 1919